The sixth season of Ang Probinsyano, a Philippine action drama television series on ABS-CBN, premiered on September 24, 2018, on the network's Primetime Bida evening block and worldwide on The Filipino Channel and concluded on April 5, 2019, after a total of 140 episodes, and following the celebration of its third anniversary. The series stars Coco Martin as SPO2 Ricardo Dalisay, together with an ensemble cast.

The sixth season of Ang Probinsyano follows Cardo and Vendetta's continued struggle against Lucas Cabrera, now President of the Philippines and Renato Hipolito. After rescuing the incumbent President Oscar Hidalgo from an assassination plot intended to supplant him as president, Vendetta must now find a way to restore Hidalgo back to the Presidency.

Elsewhere, Vendetta will also have to deal with Don Emilio Syquia who has reemerged from hiding. Now going by the name Señor Gustavo Torralba, his newfound criminal empire enjoys the protection of the Cabrera administration through the auspices of Hipolito.

As Vendetta makes its way back to Manila, their path will cross with the arrival of the baglady and bureaucrat of the Cabrera administration, Lily Ann Cortez (Lorna Tolentino). Lily plans on making the conflict between Vendetta and the Cabrera Administration more direct and emerge with the spoils from whoever it is left standing.

Plot 

Vendetta finally obtains the trust of Oscar Hidalgo (Rowell Santiago) following another assassination attempt on his life, which was timely prevented by Cardo (Coco Martin) and Vendetta with Hidalgo witnessing everything that transpired. Now aware of the true colors of his supposed political allies, Hidalgo resolves to regain the presidency which Lucas Cabrera (Edu Manzano) unlawfully stole from him.

After the unlawful arrest of General Borja (Jaime Fàbregas) before interrogating him to find Vendetta's whereabouts, they had a party along with Lucas and Brandon Cabrera (Mark Anthony Fernandez) at the PNP Headquarters and one of Lucas' allies Albert Hernandez (Franco Laurel) was chosen by Lucas to become his Vice President as PNP Chief Alejandro Terante (Soliman Cruz) became angered due to Renato Hipolito's (John Arcilla) negative and sarcastic remarks. 

Meanwhile, Lola Flora (Susan Roces) became more stressed since Konsehala Gina Magtanggol (Mitch Valdes) and her cohorts destroyed her eatery especially after hearing of what happened to her brother while being informed by Billy (John Medina).

With the Philippine Government worsening due to its corruption created by Lucas and his administration, Cardo informs Oscar that they need to make their move. Therefore, Jerome quickly informs Cardo about what happened to his grandfather after being informed by Billy that General Borja was not detained at Camp Crame but in a military camp where he was pummeled and tortured by Terante and his group and they were concealing their corruptive acts by blaming Vendetta. Oscar knows that their actions were illegal. Worried of endangering his family, Cardo decided to rescue his grandfather at their hands and informs them that Terante knows the location where General Borja has been illegally detained.

Despite General Borja's torture and killing one of the missing reporters to threatening him to speak about Cardo's whereabouts from one of Terante's group, Terante and his convoy were cornered by Vendetta as Cardo manages to shoot Terante to the chest, seriously wounding him and killing all the policemen he used as escorts. Trying to keep himself alive, Terante shows to the vigilante group at the safehouse where General Borja was being held captive. As soon as Cardo successfully rescued his grandfather from his clutches, Terante himself took Wangbu (Jobert Austria) as a hostage knowing he was too weak and threatens both Alyana (Yassi Pressman) and Bubbles (Bianca Manalo) by gunpoint. Due to Wangbu's stupidity, he was shot by Terante to make his escape. After Cardo rescues his grandfather and seeing a seriously wounded Wangbu due to Terante's escape, General Borja recognizes Jerome (John Prats), Rigor (Marc Solis) and General Olegario (Angel Aquino) and also salutes Oscar, recognizing him as the President of the Philippines. During the time of General Borja's captivity before Cardo and his group rescued him at the safehouse, Billy along with Mark Vargas (Lester Llansang) and Francisco "Chikoy" Rivera (Michael Roy Jornales), had plans to rescue their superior but not knowing that their new CIDG Director General had already set a trap for them due to their loyalty towards General Borja.

They returned to the house and treated Wangbu's wound. Later, Delfin called his sister to tell her that he is safe. Hipolito sarcastically remarked to Terante that he failed on his performance while recovering in the hospital, since his plan nearly led to a brawl were it not for Cabrera's intervention.

Aling Rosa (Mystica) tried to retrieve her children, but failed when Cardo intervened. Terante's men inside CIDG hatches a plan to frame Billy, Mark and Chikoy with a fake drug bust which they succeed in capturing them for interrogation about Vendetta's whereabouts. Aling Rosa then uncovered a list of Vendetta and their rewards, which she went to a police station with her boyfriend to raid the compound. Before raiding the compound, Aling Rosa tells Terante about the Vendetta's whereabouts which they currently lived at the compound. Terante did not believe her at first as many imposters were claiming that they saw Vendetta for the large reward, but she said President Hidalgo was also there made the General mobilize his men.

Meanwhile, Hipolito is going to meet the owner of the mines, Don Gustavo, which was revealed to be Don Emilio (Eddie Garcia) himself, having survived the clash between him and Vendetta in Baguio. He was saved by an elder and taught him mining and inherited the company. He was wounded and blinded on the battle.

The initial clash claimed the lives of Lolo Efren (Robert Arevalo), Lola Melba (Marissa Delgado), Marie and her parents during their breakfast meal, which forces Cardo and his group to open fire at them while trying to escape. As they were chased by policemen, Bubbles, Anton, Patrick and Diana were wounded. They commandeered the police mobile vehicles and went to a hospital to treat them. Terante and Brandon went there to kill all of them but were too late as Vendetta escaped from their clutches, making their mission a failure and all of the vanguard of policemen, 17 in all were killed. Terante was then berated by the Cabreras and Hipolito was going to cash in the proposal.

Meanwhile back at the compound, vengeance was served cold upon Rosa and her boyfriend when one of Patrick's friends killed both of them for reporting to the police and giving Vendetta's location away to them, avenging the deaths of Patrick's family.

While Cardo's comrades were being treated, one of the staff members successfully called and informed the police about Vendetta raiding the hospital, despite Ramil catching him off guard. When Cardo heard about this, he and his comrades escape the hospital before Terante and his men arrived. Cardo then commandeered a jeepney and took his comrades to Sto. Niño. Despite being in shock of what Vendetta went through, they took them under their wing. They enjoyed the sights and swam in the river. They raised plants and animals to reduce the family's upkeep on them.

Meanwhile, Señor Gustavo, relocated to Sto. Niño because the black market wanted diamonds, which was absent upon the former site. He acquired Baldo's (Rommel Padilla) consent and help. 

Hipolito, agreed upon the share of income if he could meet with Gustavo, courted Gascon Dela Vega (Ryan Eigenmann) relentlessly until Gustavo agreed at last. He went along with Homer's group. The two met on Gustavo's place and sealed the deal. The government will get 50% share and they will overlook the violations Gustavo's operations will cause. All the while, Homer recognizes Gustavo as Don Emilio, the one who mauled him for cornering him with the drug deal.

JP and Teddy continued their crusade against Cabrera, the latter went to meet up several policemen that hated Terante's rule, but unknown to them, a mole implanted by General Marquez tells his superior who 'Juan Verdad' is. JP meanwhile was hired by his former professor and he met up some students who are student activists. They organized rallies on Quezon Memorial Circle, the Palace and anywhere, Terante dispersing them every time. Teddy was threatened by an assassin from 'Juan Verdad's posts. And Cabrera's patience snapped when rallies were set up on the Palace gate, so he used force, by dispersing it without using police force, and abducting the ringleaders. One of them tried to escape, but was killed. The others fates were unknown. JP escaped the commotion and pleads to visit the youth group leader's wake, but was warned by his parents.

Brandon's power tripping continues after plasticizing with fallen policemen's families, he went to a bar, but he mauled a security guard that only intervened. The man reported the damage unto Mayor Adonis (Roderick Paulate) with Marge's (Carmi Martin) help. But Mayor Adonis was threatened by the Vice President and DILG secretary about overlooking Brandon's issue with Mang Kanor. The 2 policemen, who always frequented Konsehala Gina's karinderia, took Marge's bag. They reported it on the station, but the police does nothing. And the VP and DILG secretary threatened Adonis if he makes issues further. The mayor later retracts his accusations, and the 2 policemen took away Mang Kanor, for "investigation". Later, Adonis tried to plead with the Chief of Police, but the chief declined and laughed.

Lola Flora's quest for his brother's justice, went to overhear several victims about the lawyer's deliberate ignorance. She also talks about the case.

Tyson's men went to Baldo's group to check upon the progress of the bandit group's preparations. Baldo took the services of another bandit leader, Gapon (Ariel Villasanta). Tyson and his men spotted Bubbles and the other women washing clothes. The group tried to rape her, when Jerome and Rigor went to the rescue, but mauled by Tyson's pack, but not until Aubrey warned Vendetta about what's happening. They rescued the women and drove the gang away. After the issue, they went to the Barangay Captain, which the village head agreed upon Vendetta helping the tanods on their patrol, although in a volunteer basis. Vendetta accepted the conditions.

Hipolito and Terante's feud over the former's operation of mines and Lucas Cabrera's approval went on the boiling point. Homer suggests dealing with the PNP Chief, while Terante plans to take out Hipolito once and for all. The shrewd secretary arranged a meetup with Terante, while both thinking of getting rid of each other at all. 

Tanggol, Baldo and Gapon's group went to Diego's camp. Señor Gustavo met up with his future enforcers. The night before, his lover Madonna acts like she was victimized by a guard who overheard her conversations, so the old man killed the guard, and warned that anybody who looks at her with lasciviousness will get snuffed out.

Renato Hipolito (John Arcilla) and Alakdan (Jhong Hilario) and the Kamandag later killed PNP Chief Alejandro Terante after a short battle with him when Renato and his allies began to ambush Alejandro and the personal bodyguards in attempt to finish him and frames Vendetta for his murder. They later took out General Marquez after he suspected that Hipolito was involved in Terante's death, he also eliminated the loyal police officer to clean up his tracks. Cabrera's men abduct Virgie in retaliation and took her to a detention facility alongside others who were against Lucas' tyranny.

Meanwhile, distrust brews between Tanggol, Baldo, Gapon and Diego. While the siblings will abduct villagers for forced labor in the mines, they decided not to attack Sto. Niño, for there's too many soldiers on that town. They decided to attack San Clemente and other nearby towns, which they succeeded.

Mayor Adonis, strengthened by the belief that he had done the right thing, called a press con and implicated the VP, who is also DILG secretary on threatening him. Brandon asked his father to fix this himself. Eventually, Lucas then ordered his men to kidnap Margie in retaliation.

Wally and Elmo overheard the reason why the two policemen, Gapuz and Pantig, were always at Konsehala Gina's eatery, is to extort money to her recently reopened gambling rings. They said it to Lola Flora, who told them to do it in a quiet way.

Meanwhile, romance blossomed beyween Bubbles and Jerome, while Romulo and Diana fell in love with each other. The latter later confessed to Vendetta about their feelings for each other and Romulo eventually serenaded Diana, with the help of Vendetta.

During an outreach program by Lucas and Brandon on the victims of Vendetta, the student rally group along with JP went there as well to rally, leading to JP's kidnapping by Lucas' men. They tried to extract info on both mother and son, but failed. Teddy went on to broadcast a threat to the President fearlessly. Eventually, he would receive a gun from his editor in chief, Jonathan, and he later attempted to assassinate Lucas during an outreach, but he hesitated before doing so. Despite that, one of the reporters caught him red handed holding the gun and alerted the policemen, but he successfully escaped from their clutches.

In Gustavo's mansion, Madonna began seducing Gascon slowly by telling him that Gustavo is just abusing him due to the mining operation being in a slow pace and she prefers Gascon over Gustavo, then she plans to have all of Gustavo's riches with Gascon. One night, Gascon eventually gave in to her seduction while Gustavo was asleep.

Homer and his group went to Sto. Niño to keep an eye of the mining site. And the mines officially started when the group took the 'miners' on the site. Distrust then built up between Kamandag and Tanggol's group after Homer killed the miners that were attempting to escape, slowing down the mining operation in the process. Homer and Tanggol eventually brawled against each other when Tanggol had enough of Homer's attitude with Homer winning.

Meanwhile in Manila, Teddy asked help from the policemen, who were not loyal to Lucas, to rescue Virgie, JP, and the other prisoners. They later followed Gapuz to the detention facility secretly, then informed Teddy about it. Teddy later sneaked past and shot one of the guards, who was about to shoot JP. JP then lead his father to where Virgie is being held and successfully freed her. The policemen then raided the facility and successfully freed the other prisoners, including Margie. Lucas, Brandon, and Hernandez then learned about the breakout. The policemen then took Teddy and his family to a hideout to take shelter, but were later ambushed by Lucas' men, killing the policemen who helped them but luckily, Teddy and his family successfully escaped from Lucas' men. He asked help from Jonathan to lend him a car. When they were about to return to their house, they found Brandon and his henchmen searching their house, and they immediately left before they were spotted by Brandon's henchmen.

While Madonna is in Manila, Gustavo sends Gascon to Manila to give P50M to Hipolito and to look after Madonna even if Snooki (Sarah Jane Abad) was with her. They later stayed in a hotel before returning to Gustavo, not knowing that Gustavo was already suspecting them both. However, before Gustavo handed Gascon the P50M for Hipolito, Gascon saw the other riches that Gustavo was keeping in his safe, consisting of gold, diamonds and jewels.

Meanwhile in Sto. Niño, Romulo planned to ask for Diana's hand in marriage and asked Vendetta for help. They borrowed a horse for Romulo to use to take Diana on a walk before eventually proposing to her. After they were finished wandering, Romulo eventually took Diana to a hill and successfully proposed to her. Eventually, Cardo had decided that the group bury their weapons for good to live a new and peaceful life in Sto. Niño. Romulo and Diana later got married at the hill where Romulo proposed to her.

Back in Manila, Teddy and his family took shelter in Lola Flora's house temporarily. Eventually, Lucas' men went to the house to observe and overheard Elmo and Wally that the Arevalo family is in the house. Lucas then ordered the policemen to go to Lola Flora's house to arrest Teddy for the attempted assassination. Lola Flora allowed the police to search their house while Teddy and his family hid. After the policemen left, the Arevalo family left as well because they're no longer safe as the policemen might come back for them. Margie then told Mayor Adonis to take the Arevalo family to his rest house to take shelter.

After many of the miners suddenly died in the mining site due to extreme exhaustion, Baldo and Tanggol eventually decided to go to Sto. Niño in order to abduct the men to become the replacement miners at the site. Their attack took the lives of Lolo Marsing, Lola Nita, the Barangay Captain and several others. After Vendetta heard the gunshots, they attempted to make their escape before Cardo decided to stay and fight back along with Romulo and the rest of the group while Alyana, Diana, Bubbles, Delfin, Aubrey, Oscar along with Ana (Rhed Bustamante) and Aye (Kenken Nuyad) made their run. Baldo and his group then went after them when they were finished abducting the men. While Cardo and his group were fighting Baldo and Tanggol's group, Butete, Bulate, Rigor, and Greco were wounded. As Alyana and the rest were running from Baldo and Tanggol's group, Delfin and Aye were wounded from the ensuing chaos. Aubrey was then fatally shot by Baldo, before his group eventually retreated. They went to a nearby village to seek help but failed when the people refused, until a family helped them find a health center. After their comrades were treated, Patrick saw Baldo and Tanggol's group approaching and alerted the others, leading them to evacuate the health center right away to avoid getting caught, taking Aubrey's corpse along the way.

Brandon ordered his men to follow Mayor Adonis in order to find the location of Teddy and his family. But Adonis, along with Margie, noticed that Brandon's men were following them and decided to turn around and not go to the rest house instead. Brandon then went to Adonis' house to confront him personally about Teddy. When Adonis refused to tell the whereabouts of Teddy, Brandon beat him up until Adonis fought back and shot Brandon using the gun that was given to him by one of his bodyguards. Meanwhile, Margie wanted to visit Adonis to bring him food and confess her feelings for him at the same time. When she arrived there, she saw Adonis before Brandon fatally shoots him. With his dying breath, Adonis then confessed to Margie that he loves her as well. She decided to tell the truth about Adonis' death at the hands of Brandon, covered up by the biased media. She firstly sent her sister and niece to Adonis' safe house, where Teddy and his family are, to keep them safe.

Cardo and his group then found a home that is three mountains away from Sto. Niño. They decided to stay there as they thought that it was abandoned, but eventually the owners of the house returned and caught them. At first, the owners didn't believe them until they saw Oscar, who told them that they were telling the truth. Then, they told everything that happened in Sto. Niño when Baldo and Tanggol's army invaded. Oscar then buried Aubrey, with the help from the group, and promised to give justice for his family & the other victims in Sto. Niño. He also promised to take back his position as president that was unlawfully taken from him by Lucas.

Homer, bored on the mines and wanting to observe Baldo and Tanggol's movements, went to the barrio. But distrust for each other were simmering on both sides, with Tanggol and Baldo against Homer, and Diego and Gapon too at each other's mercy. Homer eventually learned that Cardo and Vendetta was on the barrio, and decided to join forces with Tanggol, Baldo, Gapon, and Diego to take out Cardo and Vendetta.

Cardo eventually decided to return to Sto. Niño along with a few members from Vendetta, including Oscar, to dig up the weapons that they buried there and find where Baldo and Tanggol's men kept the others without getting caught, while the wounded stayed at the house to heal their wounds. The group went to the barrio stealthily, and eliminated the group who tried to rape Doray, as well as taking their weapons afterwards. They also eliminated Diego's group. Then the group went to the church, where the bandits held the villagers to work as miners, but the villagers suffered casualties until Vendetta finished the guards, but their cover was blown. The battle between Cardo against a battalion of bandits and thugs began. Diana and the rest eventually went along to follow the group as they got worried on the safety of Cardo's group.

Señor Gustavo was dismayed at Homer's disappearance at the mining site and the slaves tried to resist, which Tyson and his group then crushed. He called Hipolito, which is on his way to collect the bribe he demanded on the old treasure hunter. The two met, and the old man hesitated giving the demand. But before that, he gave a dangerous hint about Gascon and Madonna's plan.

Meanwhile, Margie bravely revealed to the media that she herself witnessed with her own two eyes Brandon kill Adonis. Brandon, upon seeing the matter, planned to take out Margie.

Diana's group continued to look for Cardo and the rest of Vendetta and killed some of Tanggol's men along the way. Unfortunately, Homer and his group spotted them and they went on to tail them. Diana's group eventually got cornered by Homer and Gapon's group respectively. Outnumbered, the group went in an opposite direction, inadvertently leaving Diana and Bubbles behind. The two women were consequently captured by Alakdan. The rest however, ambushed and finished off Gapon and Diego, killing them both. Cardo and his group, on the other hand, managed to take out the rest of Baldo and Tanggol's army. He then, along with Romulo, engaged Tanggol and Baldo in hand-to-hand combat respectively. Cardo defeated Tanggol, then gave Caloy and the victimized men a chance to exact revenge on the notorious bandit for his constant crimes in Sto. Niño. Romulo and Baldo ended up in a river as they fought. Baldo gained the upper hand after a few hits and slashes with a wood and a knife, bloodying Romulo. But the latter managed to still fight back. Baldo retrieved his gun and was ready kill Romulo. But Romulo immediately grabbed a bamboo staff with a pointed edge and threw it like a javelin to the bandit's chest, killing him and avenging Aubrey's death. Romulo later finished Baldo’s remaining men when they arrived and attempted to kill him for killing Baldo. Afterwards, Cardo and the villagers found the rest of Vendetta, who followed them, and learned that both Diana & Bubbles were captured by Homer. Romulo then rode a horse to go after Homer's group with Cardo, along with Vendetta and the villagers, following him. Romulo manages to shoot some of Homer's men, including Roldan (Ronwaldo Martin), who were holding Diana. Afterwards, Homer arrived and Romulo sacrifices himself to protect Diana and gets fatally shot. Diana then gets recaptured by Homer and his group & was taken to Hipolito's house, along with Bubbles. While they were mourning for Romulo's death, Cardo learned from Caloy (Joven Olvido) that Homer is still alive and was working with Tanggol, Baldo, Gapon, and Diego.

Fearing that the detained people might speak up against the administration, Lucas orders his son to execute all of the prisoners they captured in the detention facility, including Billy, Mark, and Chikoy. The three CIDG policemen then fought back by taking the guns from the guards before they were executed and saved the other prisoners and escaped the detention facility together using a van along with the others. The three then went to a house of an old friend of Mark to take shelter. They decided to meet up with Teddy, which was successful and Teddy got supplies and a weapon.

While the case of Margie against Brandon still in fiscal, the Cabreras wanted to destroy Margie's reputation, they went to file the counter-affidavit by themselves, despite anti-Cabrera rallies are outside. While Margie was pestered not only by the media, but with pro-Cabrera rallying outside Lola Flora's house, then decrying Cardo and Vendetta. Konsehala Gina used this issue to boost her profile, as she faced the media, which Margie confronted. Wally and Elmo did vengeance by destroying the wheels.

Caloy and his cousins volunteered to enter the mines where Gustavo are hiding their slaves to search for Bubbles and Diana, which the group agreed upon. While the others were put into another place to recuperate and prepare for the battle ahead. Caloy and others warned Vendetta about the mines, and they said that Diana and Bubbles is in Manila, which put the group in the dilemma of either saving the mine slaves, or saving Bubbles and Diana. Cardo chose the former and called on the people who they saved to prepare for the attack.

Hipolito has a plan, which involves Diana as bait to lure out Cardo and Vendetta. And he then tasked Homer to eliminate Margie without implicating Cabreras and make it look like an accident. The case she filed were approved to be filed in the court, despite Cabreras' pressuring the fiscal.

Señor Gustavo suspected that Madonna was having an affair with Gascon, so he went on as though he suspected nothing. While having dinner, he secretly took a video of Madonna flirting with Gascon, thus proving his instincts right. Gascon, Madonna, and Snooki then proceeded to continue their plan after Gascon had a change of heart (as he didn't want to get involved before in Madonna's plans on betraying Gustavo). The 3 of them proceeded to take Gustavo's riches. When Madonna realized that they still needed to take more, she orders Snooki to go back to Gustavo's vault after the latter initially hesitated. Snooki was then caught by Gustavo red-handed stealing his riches and shoots her, despite her pleading. Gascon and Madonna then proceeded to make their escape from the mansion. Afterwards, Gustavo and his men followed them and he orders his men to kill Gascon and spare Madonna. He manages to shoot Gascon using a sniper rifle. He then took Madonna to her car and told her that she can have his riches she took from his vault as he still loved her. Madonna then told Gustavo that she never loved him in the first place. Brokenhearted, Gustavo then let her go on her car with the riches. Unbeknownst to Madonna, Gustavo placed a bomb in the car, and he then detonated it using his phone, killing Madonna in the process. Then he prepares for his inevitable rematch with Cardo and Vendetta, sporting a more brutal and heartless attitude, as he kills some tired and famished slaves.

Margie then went to her lawyer. There, Homer did the order Cabrera gave to them. He hired a fall guy to drunkenly drive a truck then ram the jeepney where Margie was riding. There are casualties and killed and wounded on the 'accident' in which Margie was one of the casualties. When Lola Flora and Margie's relatives charged on the jail where the fall guy was incarcerated, not believing the alibi, Pantig and Gapuz confronted and mocked them.

Vendetta crawls on the mine and silently took out some guards. After Gustavo killed some whiny slaves, another organized a breakout, which Gustavo and his men  also killed. Cardo was spotted by sentries, which started a gunfight. Akihiro was killed by the slaves, Bruno was killed by Rigor, and Tyson was killed by Jerome when he tried to pick up his pistol. Vendetta kept fighting Gustavo's men and Cardo mortally wounds Gustavo in a duel. He was taken to the helicopter and tried to escape, which Cardo shot down, finally ending Gustavo's life once and for all and avenging his father's death. The slaves were then saved by Vendetta and Sto. Niño's remnants. Cardo declined the offers of the survivors to assist them, as some of them lost everything and Cardo was their last hope. Cardo then told them they have a chance to rebuild their lives and all of them agreed. Then, they all prepared to go to Manila to rescue Bubbles and Diana, and topple Cabrera once and for all, via another villager's vehicle. They went on to Cardo's old friend Orlando Reyes (Hyubs Azarcon) to hide out.

Meanwhile in Manila, after the problem with Margie was done, Lucas decided to move against Vendetta, calling a General to bring a battalion of soldiers and his own men to where Vendetta is, and commanded to secure the village, expose the casualties and blame Vendetta on the carnage caused by Gustavo and Baldo's group. 

At Hipolito's house, Diana and Bubbles decided to play along the group's tune to avoid putting their lives in danger. Eventually, Renato realized that Diana was lying when he heard of the "massacre" of Vendetta in Sto. Niño in the news.

The corrupt cops planned to assassinate Lola Flora and Margie's relatives but unknown to them, the 3 CIDG policemen planned to protect their comrade's family from harm. Rallies were organized in support of Margie outside the wake, so openly killing Lola Flora is out of the question. The duo then snuck in to Lola Flora's house and attempted to kill her along with the others, when Billy, Chikoy, and Mark incapacitate them & then taking them away to Teddy's old hideout. They put a spy cam to record what the duo are arguing. Gapuz and Pantig were blaming each other for the fiasco, unknowingly they were being watched. Teddy and CIDG boys then used the recordings to spread it to the public and online. They then took Gapuz and Pantig to Camp Crame to be detained. To overwrite the Gapuz and Pantig's capture and confession, they rely on their biased media to report the 'massacre' in Sto. Niño, causing divided opinion on people. And as the two prepare to be transferred, Brandon's men attacked the convoy and Brandon gave the two another chance to do their job.

Due to the loss of the mines, Hipolito suggested to Cabrera that he will double the collection for protecting drug lords, and other illegal activities they still have. Then Renato called Lily Ann Cortez (Lorna Tolentino) to speed up the money, then go to the Palace to remit it to Cabrera. Lily, seemingly allied with the Cabreras, dismayed upon Cabreras, and she wants to ditch the group when she heard of the failures of the administration. Lucas actually overheard it, then he explained how they manage things. But Lily never budged, saying that she's frank. She withdrew all her money in her account and prepared to leave, and Lucas just made sure that Lily knows her place. But documents about her lie-cheat-steal issues arose during the Secretary's research. Lucas sent Brandon to tail her, and if possible, eliminate her. Lily went first to a church to pray, then went to her family's grave. Unknowingly, Pantig and Gapuz was on her trail.

Vendetta went to Rolando’s house. Rolando, formerly Cardo's junior in the police force, hesitatingly welcomed them. He also acquired a jeep, which the driver was once a criminal's henchman that Cardo busted during his time as a police officer. He agreed to take Vendetta on a scouting mission, to rescue Diana and Bubbles from Homer and Renato's grasp. First, they went to where Ricky Boy, their slain son, was buried along with Cardo's twin brother, Ador. Meanwhile, Lola Flora decides to send Margie's relatives on the province.

Lily was going somewhere when Gapuz's group ambushed Lily, killing the driver. When Lily was about to be executed by Pantig, Vendetta arrived and caused a shootout, and Cardo killed both Pantig and Gapuz and saved Lily. When heard the news, Lucas was furious about Brandon's latest fiasco. The son explained, to which the father snapped and smacked his own son. Meanwhile, Vendetta returned to Lando's house. Lily was shocked when she saw Oscar among them.

Vendetta smelled something fishy about Lily's identity, which the woman denied. Meanwhile, in Hipolito's hideout, Bubbles mysteriously puked, and suspected that she may be pregnant. Hipolito, still adamant of using the 2 women as bait, constantly bickered with Homer on Bubble's fate. Homer then bought a pregnancy test for Bubbles and found out that she's pregnant with his child.

Lily planned to make Vendetta and Cabrera clash, so that she return to her ways. She excused herself then went to a store to call Hipolito and tell him that Vendetta was on her position, in exchange of Lucas forgiving her. Lucas sent Renato, Brandon, some of their men and policemen to eliminate Vendetta once and for all. But with help of Lando, and despite Lily protesting, they successfully evaded the police via a dump truck. They hid in Lily's house, unknowingly and ironically that Lily was the reason of the raid. They went on to Lily's hideout and went on resting. Lily called Hipolito to complain that she was almost killed, and promised a deal with him. She then gave Vendetta weapons and supplies for their mission.

Brandon, frustrated with the countless failures, went on with his men, this time towards Lola Flora's family. He abducted the kids that Cardo cared for. Brandon thought that if the elders never talk, maybe the kids will tell him where Cardo is. Unknowingly, Billy was tipped by the men inside CIDG about the incident, and tailed the vans. Brandon called Lola Flora to inform her that he has the kids, and threatens them that he will execute one kid every 15 minutes if they won't reveal where Vendetta is. But Billy and the others' covers were blown and a clash ensues. The trio rescued the kids, and the police arrive on the scene, but Brandon managed to escape. Lucas wanted to cover up this failure of his son once again.

Lily, earning the trust of Vendetta, went on giving them clothes, her collection of luxury vehicles, then going with them for her contacts with weapons. She told Vendetta that Brandon was frequenting a bar and attained VIP status there, and sends them there. Hipolito is now using Lily to ensure Cabrera's downfall. As Vendetta arrives on the bar, Lily gives the group a VIP treatment, and left the group to wait for Brandon. Just the nick of time, Brandon arrived at the bar, frustrated. Cardo disguised himself as a waiter and initially throws a glass of whiskey to him, which shocked Brandon, and got his hands up in time. Cardo then asked Brandon where Diana and Bubbles were being held, to which Brandon said that the two are in Hipolito's hideout. But when they arrive at the car, he resisted and tried to escape. A clash then ensued between Vendetta and Brandon's men, but eventually he got cornered by Vendetta and was killed before he could fight back, therefore avenging Adonis' and Margie’s death. When Lucas knew of this, he ordered his private army to massacre the De Leon Family, as reprisal for his son's death. The group then went to Lola Flora's house, but Billy and the others secure their escape, but Wally got wounded and Makmak sacrificed himself to protect Lola Flora from being shot. Cardo then contacted Lola Flora using Lily's phone upon hearing the news of what happened, and told them to meet up at Lily's ancestral home, along with the Arevalo family. The De Leon and Arevalo families reunited.

Lucas decided to bait Vendetta with Diana and Bubbles, despite Homer trying to save the latter due to her pregnancy. He secured Makmak's corpse, while preparing for his son's funeral. But Cardo used himself as diversion, letting Alyana, Jerome and Rigor in. But the men Cabrera put there chased him and a gunfight starts. The rest of Vendetta then came and finished them and left the scene, taking Makmak's casket to the house.

Renato then contacted Lily, to meet up with them, but Lily wanted to double-cross the former, while Renato has no use for Lily. Lily then showed Vendetta where Renato's hideout is. A firefight then ensues between Vendetta and Kamandag. Bubbles was rescued by Jerome while Diana was rescued by Rigor, and Cardo serves vengeance for Diana's son, Bernardo, Romulo and Ricky Boy by shooting Homer's knees and his head, respectively. Then after that, they plan to disrupt Brandon's funeral, and finish Lucas once and for all. Lily called Renato to say that Vendetta will attack Brandon's funeral. Lucas and all his Cabinets were at the funeral, but the people shouted justice more on Makmak's death than Brandon's. Lily was absent from the cemetery, playing safe from both sides. As Lucas and his convoy left, Vendetta intercepted them. A firefight then ensues. Some members of Vendetta got wounded, Anton saved Diana from being shot by Renato and was shot down instead, but Lucas was killed by Cardo and Renato was wounded, despite countless men arrived and ambushed the group and assist Lucas and Renato, Vendetta retreated afterwards. The news about Lucas' death was received with overjoy, with rallies supporting Vendetta was organized.

As they mourn Anton's (Mark Lapid) death, Oscar suggested that they surrender, but others rebuffed his offer. So Oscar was forced to betray them. A battalion of policemen arrived to arrest them. There, they learn that Oscar betrayed them although they understand that he will do anything to release them especially Cardo after he saved him from Lucas's action. Lola Flora pleaded to Cardo to surrender. Vendetta obeyed the grandmother. They were led to the cell to take post-arrest procedures. As Oscar returns to his rightful seat, he ponders and regrets that Lucas besmirched the President's title for his own selfish desires. Then, he was sworn once again. Afterwards, he told the media of everything what had happened to him when Lucas ordered his assassination and that Vendetta are not criminals as they had saved him from Lucas' men. Meanwhile, another storm is brewing. Renato survived the fight, helped by Lily on his recuperation. He desires to exude chaos once again. But Lily has other plans. Just as she used Vendetta to ensure Lucas' fall, so too will she use him for her personal use.

Vendetta was put into court to read their punishment regarding rebellion cases the government filed against them, which they plead guilty. Purges and arrests against Cabrera's allies begin after Oscar assumes the Presidency, starting from VP Hernandez and the Executive Secretary Damien. They confesses everybody who was aligned with Lucas Cabrera on the interrogation, arresting those named 'Midnight Cabinets', Cabinet members who were aligned with Lucas and were accused of corruption. Makmak was cremated, and they return to their home, damaged by the incident.

Lily made her move, this time talking to both Cardo and Oscar. Then Oscar visits the cell to tell Vendetta that he filed pardon resolutions on them. Then, news about Vendetta's pardon were met with overzealous celebrations. Oscar also planned a party for Vendetta on the Palace, and Hipolito overheard it. He sarcastically congratulated Lily for doing a good job of fooling both Hidalgo and Vendetta. Lily demanded payment on her behalf, which Renato explained that he will pay later.

Meanwhile, a task force was created to pursue other members of Lucas Cabrera's remnant circle. His police chief recommended Major Basco (Raymart Santiago) to lead the op. As Lola Flora and Vendetta leaves, they met Konsehala Gina and others, and the latter sarcastically remarked, which Lola Flora wished them well and leave alongside others. Back at the house, they plan to further spread malicious remarks against both Lola Flora and Vendetta and destroy their reputation, so that Oscar will acknowledge her, hoping she could use the association to attain higher office.

Cast and characters 

Main cast
 Coco Martin as SPO2 Ricardo "Cardo" Dalisay
 Edu Manzano as  President Lucas Cabrera
 Jaime Fabregas as PDir. Delfin S. Borja
 Angel Aquino as BGen. Diana T. Olegario
 John Arcilla as Director Renato "Buwitre" Hipolito
 Rowell Santiago as President Oscar Hidalgo
 Jhong Hilario as Homer "Alakdan" Adlawan
 John Prats as SPO3 Jerome Girona, Jr.
 Mark Anthony Fernandez as Brandon Cabrera
 Mitch Valdes as Konsehala Gina Magtanggol
 Yassi Pressman as Alyana R. Arevalo-Dalisay
 Ryza Cenon as Aubrey Hidalgo
 Lorna Tolentino as Lily Ann Cortez
 Susan Roces as Flora "Lola Kap" S. Borja-de Leon 
 Eddie Garcia as Don Emilio Syquia/Señor Gustavo Torralba
 Lito Lapid as Romulo "Leon" Dumaguit

Recurring cast
 Malou Crisologo as Yolanda "Yolly" Capuyao-Santos
 Marvin Yap as Elmo Santos
 John Medina as PS/Insp. Avel "Billy" M. Guzman
 Lester Llansang as PS/Insp. Mark Vargas
 Michael Roy Jornales as PS/Insp. Francisco "Chikoy" Rivera
 Marc Solis as SPO1 Rigor Soriano
 PJ Endrinal as Wally Nieves
 Pedro “Zaito” Canon, Jr. as Nick
 Roy "Shernan" Gaite as Gido
 McNeal "Awra" Briguela as Macario "Makmak" Samonte, Jr.
 James "Paquito" Sagarino as Paquito Alvarado
 Rhian "Dang" Ramos as Amanda “Dang” Ignacio
 Shantel Crislyn Layh "Ligaya" Ngujo as Ligaya Dungalo
 Joel Torre as Teodoro "Teddy" Arevalo/Juan Verdad
 Shamaine Centenera-Buencamino as Virginia "Virgie" R. Arevalo
 McCoy de Leon as Juan Pablo "JP" R. Arevalo

Guest cast

Episodes 

<onlyinclude>

</table>
</onlyinclude>

Notes

References

External links

2018 Philippine television seasons
2019 Philippine television seasons